Shirva may refer to:
 Shirva, India
 Shirva, Iran